Danilo Gomes may refer to:

Danilo Gustavo Vergne Gomes (born 1981), Brazilian former football midfielder
Danilo Gomes Magalhães (born 1999), Brazilian football attacking midfielder

See also
Danilo Gómez (born 2002), Argentine professional footballer